Buena Vista School District may refer to:
 Buena Vista Elementary School District, a public elementary school district in Tulare, California
 Buena Vista School District (Michigan), a former public school district in Buena Vista Charter Township, Michigan
 Panama Buena Vista Union School District, a public elementary school district in Bakersfield, California

See also 
 Buena Vista School